White Limozeen is the twenty-ninth solo studio album by American entertainer Dolly Parton. It was released on May 30, 1989, by Columbia Records. The album returned the performer to the country music fold, after the critical and commercial failure of 1987's Rainbow. The album was produced by Ricky Skaggs, and featured a duet with Mac Davis, along with a cover version of Don Francisco's Christian classic, "He's Alive", as well as a bluegrass cover of the 1978 REO Speedwagon hit "Time for Me to Fly." For Parton's efforts, she was rewarded with two country #1 singles:  "Why'd You Come in Here Lookin' Like That" and "Yellow Roses".  The album spent 100 weeks and peaked at #3 on the U.S. country albums chart and won Parton back much of the critical praise she had lost with Rainbow. It ended up being certified Gold by the Recording Industry Association of America.

In 2009, Sony BMG re-released White Limozeen in a triple-feature CD set with Eagle When She Flies and Slow Dancing with the Moon.

Track listing

Chart performance
Album
{| class="wikitable"
! Chart (1989)
! Peakposition
|-
| U.S. Billboard Top Country Albums
| align="center"| 3
|-
| Australia (ARIA Charts)
| align="center"| 116
|-
| Canadian RPM Country Albums
| align="center"| 18
|}

Album (Year-End)

Singles
In anticipation of the album, in April 1989 the lead single, "Why'd You Come in Here Lookin' Like That" was released.  It was a #1 Country single, and was given a music video.

After the album showed to be doing well, in July 1989 the second single, "Yellow Roses" was released, also becoming a #1 Country single.

November 1989 saw the third single, "He's Alive" being released.  An accompanying video was released, consisting of footage of Parton's performance of the song on the CMA Awards show, earlier that month.  It was a cover of Don Francisco's song of the same name.  The single peaked at # 39.

In February 1990 she released the fourth single, "Time For Me to Fly", a bluegrass cover of REO Speedwagon's 1978 hit of the same name.  Like its immediate predecessor, the single also peaked at #39.

In May 1990 the fifth single, the title track, was released, also without promotion, as by this point she was recording a holiday album, Home for Christmas.'' It reached #29 on the country singles charts.

A sixth single, "Slow Healing Heart", was released that same year, but is rarely known, and it was the final bit of promotion for this album. The single did not chart.

Production
Produced By Ricky Skaggs
Engineered By Tom Harding, Scott Hendricks, Pat Hutchinson, Doug Johnson, George Massenburg, Mike Poole & Ed Seay
Assistant Engineers: Jeff Giedt, Rodney Good, Brad Jones
Mixing: Doug Johnson
Mastering: Denny Purcell
Engineer Outboard Gear Service: Studio Equipment Rental (co owner: Pamela M Jones)

Personnel
Dolly Parton - vocals
Eddie Bayers - drums
Farrell Morris, Ricky Skaggs - percussion
Mike Brignardello, Craig Nelson - bass guitar
Barry Beckett, David Huntsinger, John Barlow Jarvis - keyboards, piano, DX-7
Mark Casstevens, Steve Gibson, Vince Gill, Albert Lee, Mac McAnally, Ricky Skaggs, Reggie Young - guitar
Stuart Duncan, Ricky Skaggs - fiddle
Paul Franklin - pedabro
Terry Crisp, Lloyd Green, John Hughey, Paul Franklin - steel guitar
Béla Fleck - banjo
David Huntsinger - piano
Ricky Skaggs - mandolin
Bob Mason - cello
Bobby Taylor - oboe
Jo-El Sonnier - Cajun accordion
Nashville String Machine - strings
Bergen White - string arrangements
Curtis Young, Liana Young, Lisa Silver, Bernard Peyton, Kim Morrison, Vicki Hampton, Yvonne Hodges, Richard Dennison - backing vocals

References

External links
White Limozeen at Dolly Parton On-Line

1989 albums
Columbia Records albums
Dolly Parton albums
Albums produced by Ricky Skaggs